Beaver Stadium is an outdoor college football stadium on the campus of Pennsylvania State University in University Park, Pennsylvania. It has been home to the Penn State Nittany Lions of the Big Ten Conference since 1960, though some parts of the stadium date back to 1909. It was also the site of university commencements until 1984. The stadium, as well as its predecessors, is named after James A. Beaver (1837–1914), a governor of Pennsylvania (1887–91), president of the university's board of trustees, and native of nearby Millerstown. Officially, the stadium is part of the municipality known as College Township, Pennsylvania, although it has a University Park address.

Beaver Stadium has an official seating capacity of 106,572, making it currently the second largest stadium in the Western Hemisphere and the fourth largest in the world.

Beaver Stadium is widely known as one of the toughest venues for opposing teams in collegiate athletics. In 2008, it was recognized as having the best student section in the country for the second consecutive year. In 2019, it was named student section of the year by a committee of ESPN broadcasters and writers.

In 2016, Beaver Stadium was voted the number-one football stadium in college football in a USA Today poll, garnering over 41 percent of the vote. In March 2019, USA Today conducted another poll asking voters to decide the best stadium in the United States during "Bracket Madness", which coincided with the 2019 NCAA basketball tournament. Hundreds of thousands of fans voted for their favorites throughout the week. In the championship match-up, Beaver Stadium beat Kansas’ Allen Fieldhouse to claim the title of Ultimate Stadium.

Beaver Stadium was the first to have its interior included in Google Street View.

History

Predecessors
Until 1893, Penn State teams participated in sporting events on Old Main lawn, a large grassy area in front of the primary classroom building of the time. Beaver Field, a 500-seat structure located behind the current site of the Osmond Building, was the first permanent home for Penn State's football team, and the first game played there was a Penn State victory over Western University of Pennsylvania (now the University of Pittsburgh) on November 6, 1893. In 1909, New Beaver Field opened just northeast of Rec Hall, roughly in the current location of the Nittany Parking deck. It served as Penn State's stadium until 1960, when the entire 30,000 seat stadium was dismantled and moved to the east end of campus, reassembled and expanded to 46,284 seats—the lower half of the current facility—and dubbed Beaver Stadium.

Expansions

The stadium has been expanded six times, reflecting Penn State's rise to national prominence under Joe Paterno—more than doubling in size in the process. Expansions in 1972 brought capacity to 57,538. Another expansion in 1976 increased capacity to 60,203. In 1978, 16,000 seats were added when the stadium was cut into sections and raised on hydraulic lifts, allowing the insertion of seating along the inner ring of the stadium where the track had previously been located, raising capacity to 76,639. This expansion is particularly noticeable, as there’s a distinct color change when crossing from the original, New Beaver Field steel grandstands onto the newer, stone and concrete additions. In 1980, maximum capacity increased to 83,770. In 1985, walkways were added around the tops of the end zones and entry ramps at the stadium's corners resulted in lowering the capacity to 83,370. An expansion was completed for the 1991 football season, placing an upper deck addition over the north end zone and raising capacity to 93,967.

A major and somewhat controversial construction project took place in 2001, raising the stadium's total capacity to 107,282. An upper deck was added to the south end of the stadium, blocking the view of neighboring Nittany Mountain (which had sentimental value for some fans), but making Beaver Stadium the second largest stadium in the nation, behind Michigan Stadium in Ann Arbor, Michigan.

In 2006, the stadium underwent major structural and aesthetic upgrades. Old steel beams supporting the upper seats in the east, north and west were replaced and strengthened, and new railing was installed, stronger than the old railing which collapsed following the 2005 Ohio State game.

In 2007, over 22,000 student tickets sold out in 59 minutes. In 2008, when tickets were sold by grade, tickets allotted for junior students sold out in 90 seconds, and those for sophomores and freshmen sold out in under three minutes each.

In 2011, the stadium capacity was reduced from 107,282 seats to 106,572 to comply with the Americans with Disabilities Act.

The appearance of the stadium has been enhanced with the addition of large blue letters spelling out "The Pennsylvania State University" on the west-facing suites, and a list of Penn State's undefeated, national championship, and Big Ten championship years underneath. 2012 is the exception, which was added to this list during the November 24, 2012 game against Wisconsin to honor the team that played after sanctions were passed down during the aftermath of the Jerry Sandusky scandal. On the opposite side of the stadium, letters spelling, "Penn State Nittany Lions" have been added to the press box, with "Beaver Stadium" running below. Nine markers depicting the various traditions of Beaver Stadium, including the Blue Band, the student section, and the blue buses which bring the team to the stadium, have been placed around the stadium as well. In late October, the walls surrounding the field were refaced with Pennsylvania limestone. An iron gate has replaced the old chain-link face at the players' entrance into the stadium. On the new gate the words "PENN STATE" appear in blue.

The Penn State Office of Physical Plant and Athletic Department expanded the north and south video boards to make them HD and because parts were no longer available for the old boards. The area of the new video screens dedicated to game replays and game-related video is much larger than the screens they replaced.  The two video boards together are some of the largest in college football.  The renovation expanded the size of the video boards by eliminating the current game clock and lamp matrix display. The boards are only the second of their kind made and are 4k UHD. The project was completed prior to the first home game of the 2014 season. The boards cost approx. $10 million. Also on the back of both boards is a Nittany lion logo that lights at night and was added to promote the "Penn State Brand". Starting with the 2015 season fireworks are shot off from the top of each scoreboard when the team takes the field.

In the fall semester of 2015, university officials stated that they are seeking options to renovate or replace Beaver Stadium in the next 10 years. Officials state that there is a recognized need in an upgrade in the facilities. The stadium remains antiquated, despite multiple expansions and the additions of luxury boxes and HD scoreboards. Outdated plumbing requires complete winterization each November. Elevators are small and sluggish while concourses are narrow. The stadium lacks concession options and still uses bleachers. The limitations prevent wider use of the venue; the university would like to expand the number of events held at Beaver Stadium, such as major concerts and a long-discussed potential hosting of the NHL Winter Classic. Many fans are opposed to replacing Beaver Stadium due to the history and tradition but many agree that there is a need for renovation.

On Sept. 8, 2021, Penn State dedicated a Chair of Honor for all prisoners of war/missing in action (POW/MIA) service members in the "SLU" section of the stadium, above the student section, where it will remain empty in perpetuity. This chair was unveiled during the Nittany Lion's first home football game of the season against Ball State on Sept. 11.

Attendance records

A record crowd of 110,889 witnessed Penn State's 27-26 loss to Ohio State on September 29, 2018.

In 2002, Penn State set an NCAA record for most fans to ever watch a college football team over the course of a single season at home. Beaver Stadium hosted 8 games in 2002, and averaged 107,239 per game totaling what was at the time an NCAA record of 857,911 in total home attendance.  Penn State averaged 95,977 fans in attendance both home and away over the 13 game schedule which broke the all time full season attendance NCAA record at 1,247,707 spectators over the course of the 2002 campaign.

All-time Beaver Stadium records

Attendance record by Beaver Stadium capacity

Traditions

Chants
"We Are Penn State" - Perhaps the most well-known chant across campus, "We Are Penn State" conveys the university's sense of unity and school pride. At Beaver Stadium, the chant is often relayed across the stadium in a "We Are...Penn State" call and response, with each side of the grandstand chanting one half of the motto.  This is typically followed by a similar "Thank You...You're Welcome" chant. It is also featured in Penn State's White Out games, which use Zombie Nation's Kernkraft 400 as the fight song instead of Fight On, State.

"Let's Go, PSU" - A more recently started chant which plays during a performance of The Hey Song by the Penn State Blue Band prior to every game.

Tailgating
Tailgating is very popular outside Beaver Stadium. Alcohol is permitted in all areas around Beaver Stadium and is sold inside the stadium on home football games, as of 2022. In August 2019, Penn State was ranked #15 by tailgater magazine for the "tailgate culture" that surrounds Beaver Stadium on gameday. The magazine stated that "win or lose, the university offers an incredible tailgate environment" for over 100,000 fans, referencing traditions related to Penn State football such as camping outside Beaver Stadium for Nittanyville to making ice cream stops at Berkey Creamery.

Student section "S-Zone"

The "S-Zone" within the student section is another tradition at Beaver Stadium. A small section behind the end zone are all given white and blue shirts supplied by the Pennsylvania State University Lion Ambassadors to create an "S" in the student section. The "S-zone" was moved from the 20 yard line to its current location at the beginning of the 2011 football season, as the student section was shifted over to between the 10 yard lines. For the 2008, 2011, 2013, and 2018 Homecoming Games, the "S-zone" was black and pink, in honor of the original Penn State colors. On April 21, 2007, for the Annual Blue and White Game (Spring Scrimmage), the "S" zone was converted to a "VT" zone, in honor of the victims of the massacre that took place on April 16, 2007, at Virginia Tech.

Nittanyville

Starting with the October 2005 game against Ohio State, students have camped out outside Gate A to obtain good seats for home games; "Nittanyville" is a recognized university club with rules of conduct. It was originally known as "Paternoville." During whiteout games, a special week-long camping starts on Monday instead of the usual Wednesday or Thursday.

Whiteout games

After failed experiments with "Code Blue" during the down year of 2004, a localized version of the "Winnipeg White Out" made national headlines during the 2005 game versus Ohio State. In this game, despite  temperatures and a misty rain, nearly every student, along with many other fans, wore a white shirt to the game, creating a sea of white. This was deemed a success, as the student section was declared "the best in the country" by ESPN analyst Kirk Herbstreit, and the Nittany Lions won the game in an intense defensive battle, 17–10. The student section was widely credited with aiding the defense, which kept the Buckeyes' future Heisman Trophy winning quarterback, Troy Smith, in check by intercepting a pass and recovering a decisive fumble in the final minutes. Smith was forced to call several timeouts during the game due to inability to communicate with his offense on the field.

In 2007, for the Notre Dame game, a full-stadium "White House" was declared. While it is widely believed that this change was a result of the National Hockey League's Phoenix Coyotes notifying the university that the phrase "White Out" was trademarked by the franchise during their time as the Winnipeg Jets, the "White House" moniker was invented to remind the crowd that everyone, and not just the student section, was to wear white. The newly christened "White House" was also deemed a success, as nearly every Penn State fan in attendance wore white, and the Lions won, 31–10. In 2008, the White House was met with similar success, a 38–24 win over Illinois. From 2012 to 2019, the "full stadium" Whiteout games have been against either Ohio State or Michigan. In 2021, the first Southeastern Conference (SEC) team, the Auburn Tigers played during the Whiteout, the Nittany Lions won 28–20.

Zombie Nation
Zombie Nation is a tradition that was started during the 2004 football season.  After the Nittany Lions make a big play, (typically on defense) the stadium blasts the song "Kernkraft 400" by Zombie Nation which ignites 107,000 into a frenzied blur all bouncing up and down in unison, waving towels and shakers wildly chanting "WE ARE PENN STATE" during the break in the melody of the song.  The tradition gained national attention in 2005, after Penn State's 17–10 victory over Ohio State, which at the time, delivered the second highest audience for a regular season college football game ever on ESPN. Zombie Nation along with the Penn State Whiteout, have been direct influencers of Beaver Stadium being home to what many consider the best student section in college football. Since the tradition began, both Zombie Nation and the Whiteout have since spread to encompass the entire stadium.

Tunnel entrance
The tunnel entrance is a Nittany Lions tradition in which the head coach leads the team from the locker room under the South side of the stadium to the tunnel to a closed metal gate reading "PENN STATE" in bold Arial font. When the team arrives at the gate, the Nittany Lion opens the gate and motion for the team to walk through it, as if welcoming the team to the field. The team then lingers until four minutes were left on the pregame clock, and then the head coach leads the team through the tunnel created by the Blue Band.

Fast and slow wave
The Penn State Student Section initiates a wave during sporting events. After the wave passes around the stadium twice, the student section slows down the wave to about a fourth the speed of the normal wave. After the slow wave passes, the wave speeds up to over twice the speed of the normal wave. The wave has, on occasion, been reversed in direction following the fast wave.

Blue Band traditions

The Flip
After the Penn State Blue Band has entered the field and played the first eight bars of "Hail to the Lion", the Blue Band's Drum Major does a high-stepping, stiff-legged sprint in between rows of band members from the goal line to the 50 yard line, where he does a front flip. Legend states that if the drum major lands the flip, the team will win that afternoon. He then performs another flip while running towards the end zone. After he stands back up, he and the Nittany Lion, who is holding his baton, take five high-steps toward each other, meeting 5 yards deep in the end zone. The Lion and Drum Major both place both hands on the baton in alternating order (in the same manner children choosing teams with a baseball bat would) and then throw the baton into the ground. They then salute each other, embrace arms, and then both excitedly run towards the student section, where they are cheered enthusiastically.

Floating Lions
The Blue Band performs "Hail to the Lion" and makes its way from its "PSU" formation to roll into spelling "LIONS" as it marches across the field. Once reaching the other side, the band reverses the "LIONS" to be readable to the east side of the stadium, while playing "Fight On, State". This is known as the "trademark drill" of the Blue Band.

See also
 List of NCAA Division I FBS football stadiums

References

External links

 

College football venues
Penn State Nittany Lions football
Sports venues in Pennsylvania
American football venues in Pennsylvania
Defunct athletics (track and field) venues in the United States
Pennsylvania State University campus
Tourist attractions in Centre County, Pennsylvania
1960 establishments in Pennsylvania
Sports venues completed in 1960